Jensen-Gerard Karp  is an American producer, writer, actor, podcaster, gallerist, and former rapper. Previously known by his stage name Hot Karl, he signed a record deal with Interscope in his early 20s and has gone on to produce and write for television and radio.

Career

Music 
Karp was raised in Calabasas, California.  After a brief stint in hip-hop at 11 years old signed for management to Ice-T's Rhyme Syndicate, Karp entered the Roll Call freestyle competition on Los Angeles radio station Power 106, during his time at USC, where he lasted a record 45 days on air to become the show's all-time champion. Karl created a demo exhibiting his satirical style and tightly wound rhymes. He eventually signed with Interscope Records for what he said was a million dollars, where he recorded what was to be his debut album, Your Housekeeper Hates You, which included guest appearances by Redman, Kanye West, will.i.am, DJ Quik, Fabolous, Mýa, Sugar Ray, DJ Clue, and MC Serch. However, Interscope informed Karl that his album could not be commercially released due to scheduling conflicts and he decided to leave Interscope. Jensen released his memoir, Kanye West Owes Me $300 (and other true stories from a white rapper who ALMOST made it big), detailing the entire experience in June 2016 with Crown Books.

In 2013, Karp recorded his first song in 10 years for his favorite basketball team, the Los Angeles Clippers, at the request of the team's in-arena DJ.

In 2016, Karp recorded a song titled "Like Riding a Bike", featuring Mike Shinoda from Linkin Park, which is available on SoundCloud.

Radio 
In October 2018, Karp joined the cast of the Kevin and Bean morning show, hosted by Kevin Ryder and Gene "Bean" Baxter on alternative rock station KROQ 106.7 FM in Los Angeles. He had a regular segment called "Get Up on This", based on his podcast.  On March 18, 2020, it was announced that the entire morning crew had been let go by KROQ, over the phone at the start of the COVID-19 pandemic.  It was reported that the station lost half its audience in the 2 weeks after letting them go as office and car listening fell rapidly across America as the pandemic emerged.

Television 
Karp was a writer for WWE Raw for seven months during 2006.

He also appeared on Season 1 of VH1's Barely Famous playing Erin Foster's boyfriend and was seen numerous times on the final season of Candidly Nicole. Karp also appeared on Comedy Central's @midnight.
 which aired 31 episodes starting in 2017. Karp was credited as an executive producer for 7 episodes.

Karp has written for Sacha Baron Cohen's Who Is America? The Grammys, The ESPYs, The MTV Movie Awards, The Masked Singer, and the NFL on Fox.

Art 
Karp co-owns and operates Gallery 1988, two pop art focused galleries in Los Angeles, California both located on Melrose Avenue. He co-wrote the book Just Can't Get Enough for Abrams Books with Matthew Robinson. Gallery 1988 is well known for its Kevin Smith hosted annual show, Crazy 4 Cult, where 100 artists reinterpret classic cult movies in their own style. At one time, Karp was also the brand manager and designer for Pete Wentz's Clandestine Industries. His marketing company, Tyson/Givens Design & Marketing created the LOST Underground Art Project for the show's final season and worked with the TV show Breaking Bad. The gallery has also hosted exhibits for movies including The Avengers, Rick and Morty and Star Wars: The Force Awakens.

Podcasts 

On July 1, 2020, Karp and his wife, Danielle Fishel, started a new podcast called Talk Ain't Cheap, where they analyze and dissect the Cameo accounts of celebrities. They also launched a Patreon account that grants early access to the show, as well as other podcasts and an interactive Instagram game show called Scorantine. The podcast has drawn criticism as the idea was stolen from the Canadian podcast Blocked Party. The show was originally called Word Up! which is a direct copy of Blocked Party's segment title.

Personal life
On July 4, 2017, towards the end of episode #303 of his podcast Get Up On This,  he announced that he was dating actress Danielle Fishel.  The two attended high school together but only began a romantic relationship after reconnecting as adults. On March 22, 2018, Fishel and Karp got engaged. They married on November 4, 2018. Fishel announced in January 2019 that she and Karp were expecting their first child in July 2019. On July 1, 2019, Fishel and Karp announced that Fishel gave birth to a boy in June 2019, almost one month early, via Instagram post. In August 2021, Fishel gave birth to their second child, a son.

In popular culture
Karp appeared on The Howard Stern Show in 2011 to talk about his time in the rap industry and perform The Roll Call with Howard & Lisa G. He also acted as the Creative Director at comedy YouTube Channel, Jash, where he produced and wrote on projects like The ArScheerio Paul Show and the Chance the Rapper music video for "Na Na.". He has written for Rolling Stone, the ESPYs, the MTV Movie and Video Awards, The Late Late Show with James Corden, and Funny or Die.

Cinnamon Toast Crunch incident
On March 22, 2021, Karp tweeted a photograph of apparent discarded shrimp tails he claimed to have found in a box of Cinnamon Toast Crunch he purchased, despite the facility not producing a single product containing shrimp. Additionally, Karp said he found a piece of string, "small black pieces" embedded into some pieces of the cereal, and an object that looked like a pea. The tweet about the alleged incident went viral, bringing safety concerns in General Mills' manufacturing process into question. General Mills later issued a statement on Twitter claiming the tails were "an accumulation of the cinnamon sugar that sometimes can occur when ingredients aren't thoroughly blended". A company representative claimed “that there’s no possibility of cross contamination with shrimp”. As of March 23, General Mills claims that the company is investigating the case, but that contamination "did not occur at [their] facility". Karp's presence on Twitter ceased at the time of this incident, alongside concurrent accusations of emotional abuse and gaslighting by former romantic partners. His last tweet was posted on 24 March 2021.

Bibliography 
Just Can't Get Enough (2007) Co-written with Matthew Robinson
Kanye West Owes Me $300: And Other True Stories from a White Rapper Who Almost Made It Big (2016)

References

External links
 
 
 

1979 births
21st-century American rappers
21st-century American male musicians
American male singers
American podcasters
Living people
People from Calabasas, California
Rappers from California